1938 in sports describes the year's events in world sport.

Alpine skiing
FIS Alpine World Ski Championships
8th FIS Alpine World Ski Championships are held at Engelberg, Switzerland.  The events are a downhill, a slalom and a combined race in both the men's and women's categories.  The winners are:
 Men's Downhill – James Couttet (France)
 Men's Slalom – Rudolf Rominger (Switzerland)
 Men's Combined – Emile Allais (France)
 Women's Downhill – Lisa Resch (Germany)
 Women's Slalom – Christl Cranz (Germany)
 Women's Combined – Christl Cranz (Germany)

American football
 NFL Championship – the New York Giants won 23–17 over the Green Bay Packers at the Polo Grounds
 First High School Oil Bowl is played.

Association football
World Cup
 1938 World Cup held in France – Italy retain their title, beating Hungary 4–2 in the final.
England
 First Division – Arsenal win the 1937–38 title
 FA Cup – Preston North End beat Huddersfield Town 1-0
Spain
 La Liga – not contested due to the Spanish Civil War
Germany
 German football championship won by Hannover 96
Italy
 Serie A won by Ambrosiana-Inter
Portugal
 Primeira Liga won by S.L. Benfica
France
 French Division 1 won by Sochaux-Montbéliard

Athletics
 March 3 – Glenn Cunningham breaks the world record for the indoor mile run by completing the distance in 4 minutes, 4.4 seconds.
 September 4 – European Championships Marathon at Paris is won by Väinö Muinonen (Finland) in a time of 2:37:29

Australian rules football
 The Victorian Football Association legalized throwing the ball in general play, establishing its own code of Australian rules football which was distinct from the national code administered by the Australian National Football Council. It was the beginning of a decade-long schism which ran from 1938 until 1949.
 Victorian Football League
 24 September – Carlton wins the 42nd VFL Premiership, defeating Collingwood 15.10 (100) to 13.7 (85) in the 1938 VFL Grand Final
 Brownlow Medal awarded to Dick Reynolds (Essendon)
 South Australian National Football League
 1 October – South Adelaide 23.14 (152) defeat Port Adelaide 15.16 (106) in the 1938 SANFL Grand Final
 Magarey Medal won by Bob Quinn (Port Adelaide)
 Western Australian National Football League
 15 October – Claremont 15.11 (101) defeat East Fremantle 11.13 (79) to win their first WANFL premiership in the Grand Final Replay, after the Tigers had scored 13.16 (94) to Old Easts’ 14.10 (94) in the first Grand Final on 8 October.
 Sandover Medal won by Haydn Bunton, Sr. (Subiaco)

Baseball
 World Series – New York Yankees defeat the Chicago Cubs, 4–0.
 Hall of Fame election – Continuing toward the goal of 10 initial inductees at the 1939 opening of the Hall, voters select Grover Cleveland Alexander. A special committee selects organizer Alexander Cartwright and promoter Henry Chadwick; selections of 19th century players are again postponed.
 Starting pitcher Johnny Vander Meer (Cincinnati Reds) throws back–to–back no-hitters, meaning they came in two consecutive starts, something not accomplished before or since.
 March 1 – Nankai Hawks, officially founded in Japanese Baseball League, as predecessor of Fukuoka SoftBank Hawks.

Basketball
NBL Championship

Akron Goodyear Wingfoots win two games to one over the Oshkosh All-Stars

Events
 The sixth South American Basketball Championship in Lima is won by Peru.
Argentina 
 Asociacion Deportiva Atenas was founded in Cordoba on April 17.

Boxing
Events
 American boxer Henry Armstrong simultaneously holds the welterweight, lightweight, and featherweight world titles.
Lineal world champions
 World Heavyweight Championship – Joe Louis
 World Light Heavyweight Championship – John Henry Lewis
 World Middleweight Championship – vacant
 World Welterweight Championship – Barney Ross → Henry Armstrong
 World Lightweight Championship – Lou Ambers → Henry Armstrong
 World Featherweight Championship – Henry Armstrong → vacant
 World Bantamweight Championship – Harry Jeffra → Sixto Escobar
 World Flyweight Championship – Benny Lynch → vacant → Peter Kane

Cricket
Events
 24 August – England defeat Australia by an innings and 579 runs, the biggest winning margin in Test cricket history.
England
 County Championship – won by Yorkshire
 Minor Counties Championship – won by Buckinghamshire 
 Most runs – Wally Hammond 3,011 @ 75.27 (HS 271)
 Most wickets – Arthur Wellard 172 @ 20.29 (BB 7–59)
 England and Australia tie one Test each with two draws
 Wisden Cricketers of the Year – Hugh Bartlett, Bill Brown, Denis Compton, Kenneth Farnes, Arthur Wood
Australia
 Sheffield Shield won by New South Wales
 Most runs – Don Bradman 1,437 @ 89.81 (HS 246)
 Most wickets
Bill O‘Reilly 64 @ 12.25 (BB 9-41)
Chuck Fleetwood-Smith 64 @ 22.43 (BB 9–135)
India
 Bombay Pentangular – Muslims
 Ranji Trophy – Hyderabad beat Nawanagar by one wicket
South Africa
 Currie Cup – not contested
New Zealand
 Plunket Shield – won by Auckland
West Indies
 Inter-Colonial Tournament – won by British Guiana

Cycling
Tour de France
 Gino Bartali wins the 32nd Tour de France
Giro d'Italia
 Giovanni Valetti of Fréjus wins the 26th Giro d'Italia

Figure skating
 World Figure Skating Championships –
 Men's champion: Felix Kaspar, Austria
 Ladies' champion: Megan Taylor, Great Britain
 Pair skating champion: Maxi Herber & Ernst Baier, Germany

Golf
Men's professional
 Masters Tournament – Henry Picard
 U.S. Open – Ralph Guldahl
 British Open – Reg Whitcombe
 PGA Championship – Paul Runyan
Men's amateur
 British Amateur – Charlie Yates
 U.S. Amateur – Willie Turnesa
Women's professional
 Women's Western Open – Bea Barrett
 Titleholders Championship – Patty Berg

Horse racing
 In what is billed as the “Match of the Century”, Seabiscuit defeats the US Triple Crown of Thoroughbred Racing champion, War Admiral.
Steeplechases
 Cheltenham Gold Cup – Morse Code
 Grand National – Battleship
Hurdle races
 Champion Hurdle – Our Hope
Flat races
 Australia – Melbourne Cup won by Catalogue
 Canada – King's Plate won by Bunty Lawless
 France – Prix de l'Arc de Triomphe won by Eclair au Chocolat
 Ireland – Irish Derby Stakes won by Rosewell
 English Triple Crown Races:
 2,000 Guineas Stakes – Pasch
 The Derby – Bois Roussel
 St. Leger Stakes – Scottish Union
 United States Triple Crown Races:
 Kentucky Derby – Lawrin
 Preakness Stakes – War Admiral
 Belmont Stakes – War Admiral

Ice hockey
 Chicago Black Hawks defeat the Toronto Maple Leafs three games to one in the Stanley Cup final series.

Motorsport

Multi-sport events

 3rd British Empire Games held in Sydney, Australia

Nordic skiing
FIS Nordic World Ski Championships
 11th FIS Nordic World Ski Championships 1938 are held at Lahti, Finland

Rowing
The Boat Race
 2 April — Oxford wins the 90th Oxford and Cambridge Boat Race

Rugby league
1938 European Rugby League Championship / 1938–39 European Rugby League Championship
1938 New Zealand rugby league season
1938 NSWRFL season
1937–38 Northern Rugby Football League season / 1938–39 Northern Rugby Football League season

Rugby union
 51st Home Nations Championship series is won by Scotland

Skiing
 The Cannon Mountain Aerial Tramway, the first aerial tramway in the United States, opens at Cannon Mountain Ski Area.

Snooker
 World Snooker Championship – Joe Davis beats Sidney Smith 37–24

Speed skating
Speed Skating World Championships
 Men's All-round Champion – Ivar Ballangrud (Norway)
 Women's All-round Champion – Laila Schou Nilsen (Norway)

Tennis
Australia
 Australian Men's Singles Championship – Don Budge (USA) defeats John Bromwich (Australia) 6–4, 6–2, 6–1
 Australian Women's Singles Championship – Dorothy Cheney (USA) defeats Dorothy Stevenson (Australia) 6–3, 6–2
England
 Wimbledon Men's Singles Championship – Don Budge (USA) defeats Bunny Austin (Great Britain) 6–1, 6–0, 6–3
 Wimbledon Women's Singles Championship – Helen Wills Moody (USA) defeats Helen Jacobs (USA) 6–4, 6–0
France
 French Men's Singles Championship – Don Budge (USA) defeats Roderich Menzel (Czechoslovakia) 6–3, 6–2, 6–4
 French Women's Singles Championship – Simonne Mathieu (France) defeats Nelly Adamson Landry (France) 6–0, 6–3
USA
 American Men's Singles Championship – Don Budge (USA) defeats Gene Mako (USA) 6–3, 6–8, 6–2, 6–1
 American Women's Singles Championship – Alice Marble (USA) defeats Nancye Wynne Bolton (Australia) 6–0, 6–3
Events
 Don Budge becomes the first male tennis player to complete the Grand Slam in tennis of all 4 Championships.
Davis Cup
 1938 International Lawn Tennis Challenge –  3–2  at Germantown Cricket Club (grass) Philadelphia, United States

Awards
 Associated Press Male Athlete of the Year – Don Budge, Tennis
 Associated Press Female Athlete of the Year – Patty Berg, LPGA golf

References

 
Sports by year